The 2000–01 Midland Football Combination season was the 64th in the history of Midland Football Combination, a football competition in England.

Premier Division

The Premier Division featured 18 clubs which competed in the division last season, along with three new clubs:
Clubs promoted from Division One:
Brookvale Athletic, who also changed name to Sutton Town
Romulus
Plus:
Pershore Town, relegated from the Midland Football Alliance

Also:
Marconi changed name to Coventry Marconi
Blackheath Electrodrives changed name to Blackheath Invensys

League table

References

2000–01
9